The October class is a series of six missile boats constructed for the Egyptian Navy in the mid-1970s as a replacement for the aging s. The design of the vessels is based on the Komar class and the six ships were constructed at Alexandria, Egypt and completed by Vosper Thornycroft at Portsmouth, United Kingdom. They entered service in the late 1970s. Two were removed from service and four are still active.

Design and description
The October class is based on the Soviet s, which had been acquired by the Egyptian Navy in 1962. Their small size leads to very cramped conditions for the crew, with access to the engine room through a removable operations room. The missile boats have a complement of 20.

Missile boats in the class are armed with two OTO Melara Otomat surface-to-surface missiles and four Type 32 30 mm/75 guns in two twin mounts for anti-aircraft (AA) defence. The October class are fitted with Marconi S 810 surface search radar and Marconi/ST 802 fire control radar. They also mount a Racal Cutlass radar warning system and two Protean fixed decoy launchers.

Vessels in class

Construction and history
Six October-class missile boats were ordered by the Egyptian Navy to replace the Komar-class missile boats already in service. They were constructed at the shipyard in Alexandria, Egypt and launched in 1975–1976. The incomplete missile boats were then taken to Portsmouth, United Kingdom to have the missiles and electronics installed by Vosper Thornycroft and the vessels completed between 1979 and 1981. The October-class vessels were initially named 207, 208, 209, 210, 211 and 212. The final pair to complete, 207 and 212 arrived in Egypt on 25 April 1981. The ships were renumbered to their current names and 791, while being carried aboard a freighter, was lost overboard during the delivery voyage on 16 December 1980. The missile boat was salvaged on 30 June 1981. 791 then underwent repairs, which were completed on 13 August 1982. By 2009, 785 was laid up and 791 was non-operational.

Citations

References

External links
 hazegray.org

Missile boats of the Egyptian Navy